Turi is a town and comune in the Metropolitan City of Bari and region of Apulia, southern Italy. With a population approaching 12,000, it lies a few miles inland from the town of Polignano A Mare on the Adriatic Sea.

The Italian Marxist Antonio Gramsci, imprisoned by Benito Mussolini's Fascist regime for eleven years (1926-1937), served most of his sentence in Turi, and died shortly after he was released.

References

Cities and towns in Apulia